TFG may refer to: 

 TFG (gene)
 Taipei First Girls' High School, Taiwan
 Tetragon Financial Group, a US private equity company
 Transitional federal government, Republic of Somalia 2004-2012
 Pokémon Trading Figure Game, a collectible miniatures game
 Tactical Fighter Group, USAF and National Guard term, in 184th TFG and many others
 "The Former Guy", a term that rose to prominence no later than April 2021 as a mocking way to refer to Donald Trump, the 45th President of the United States, following the end of his term.
 Task Force Games, an American game company
 Timber Framers Guild, an American non-profit organisation promoting timber framing
 Transferoviar Grup, private railway company in Romania 
 The Foschini Group, South African owner of retail clothing companies in various countries 
 Trafalgar railway station, Victoria, Australia 
 Koenigsegg TFG, an engine

See also